Cabinet Wulff may refer to two cabinets in German state politics:

first cabinet Wulff, Lower Saxony
second cabinet Wulff, Lower Saxony